The Golhā radio programmes (English: Flowers of Persian Song and Poetry) were a station of broadcast on an Iranian government-owned radio station Radio Tehran from 1956 to 1979. They comprise 1,578 radio programs consisting of approximately 847 hours of music and poetry.

Additionally published in Journal of Persianate Studies.

History 
The Golha radio programmes are made up of literary commentary with the declamation of poetry, sung with musical accompaniment and interspersed with solo musical pieces. For the 23 years that these programs were broadcast, all of Iran’s preeminent literary critics, reciters of poetry, singers, composers and musicians were invited to participate. The Golha programs consist of several separate series of programs having slightly different emphasis in content. The programs are named Golhaye Tazeh, Rangarang, Barge Sabz, Javidan and Yek Shakheh Gol.

The programs were exemplars of excellence in the sphere of music and refined examples of literary expression, making use of a repertoire of over 250 classical and modern Persian poets, setting literary and musical standards that are still looked up to with admiration in Iran today and referred to by scholars and musicians* as an encyclopedia of Persian music and Persian poetry. 

They marked a watershed in Persian culture, following which music and musicians gained respectability. Heretofore, music had been practiced behind closed doors. When performed in public spaces, the performers had been tarred with the same brush as popular street minstrels. 

Until the advent of these programs, it had been taken for granted that any female performers and musicians were less than respectable. Due to the high literary and musical quality of these programs, public perception of music and musicians in Iran shifted, its participants came to be considered-virtually for the first time in Persian history of the Islamic period—as maestros, virtuosos, divas and adepts of a fine art, and no longer looked down upon as cabaret singers or denigrated as street minstrels.

End and legacy 
The Golha programs were broadcast on a government-owned radio station, and they all came to an end with the arrival of the Iranian political revolution in 1979. During the early post-1979 years, music and song were considered counter-revolutionary and frowned upon. Many of the Golha artists permanently emigrated from Iran and many who remained ceased performing in public for a number of years. 

Female singers had been among the stars of the Radio Golha programs. The revolutionaries outlawed female solo singing. Women were free to continue to play musical instruments, and to sing in choruses, and to sing a solo in front of all-female audiences, but the recording of female solo singing was banned. This was a significant and unfortunate departure from the spirit of Radio Golha.

Homayoun Khorram, a violinist who was one of the Golha musicians, commented 25 years after the close of the show: "The Golha programs should be considered to be a veritable audio treasury of the history of traditional Persian Music. Considering the incredible efforts that went into producing these programs and their strong influence on society, they are still considered today to be the best resource for our music. It is very appropriate and important that these programs be preserved and passed on to future generations."

Jane Lewisohn, a researcher in the music department at the University of London (SOAS) conducted archival research work on Golha starting in 2005, which helped form, The Golha Project. Other organizations supporting The Golha Project include the School of Oriental and African Studies at SOAS, the British Institute of Iranian Studies, the Iranian Heritage Organization in London, and the British Library.

References 

 Jane Lewisohn, Flowers of Persian Song and Music: Davud Pirniā and the Genesis of the Golhā Programs SOASNote: The above is the on-line version of the article published by Jane Lewisohn in Journal of Persianate Studies, volume 1, (2008), 79-101
 Flowers of Persian Song and Music: The Golhā Programmes Produced by Davoud Pirnia, CD Notes, SOAS, University of London

External links 
 Golhā Website providing a comprehensive database and research archive of the Golhā Radio Programs
 Bahār Navāi, This Orchard Be Ever Pleasant (In Golestān Hamisheh Khosh Bād), in Persian, Jadid Online, 24 July 2009 Legend of Golha (a shortened version of the above report, in English).<br Audio slideshow (with English subtitles) (6 min 32 sec).
 Bahār Navāi, Golhā, The Green Present of Pirniā (Golhā, Tohfeh-ye Sabz-e Pirniā), in Persian, Jadid Online, 23 March 2010.Audio slideshow (5 min 23 sec).
 Listen to some editions of the Golha program from Ostād Javād Ma'roufi's Official Website
Radio Golha: or by pasting the URL mms://84.244.130.224/radiogolha The internet radio dedicated to broadcasting the Golha programs. Radio Golha may be listened to through the website in the browser.
 80 CDs of Radio Golha music, almost 80 hours of music, are downloadable at www.arianworld.com, CDs 1 to 50, CDs 51 to 80 here and the same CDs are also downloadable at persianhub.org.

Persian music
Iranian music
Golha (radio programme)